Myrmecozela ochraceella is a moth of the family Tineidae. It is found in Great Britain, Fennoscandia, Russia, Estonia, Poland, Hungary, Romania, Austria, Switzerland, Italy, France and Spain.

The wingspan is 15–18 mm. A small yellow-brown moth. The head, forebody and forewings are solid ochre yellow to light rust brown, the hindwings are grey with yellow hair fringes. The larva is yellowish white with a yellow-brown head.

The larvae feed on detritus in ant nests (Formica aquilonia, Formica lugubris and Formica rufa) .

References

Moths described in 1848
Myrmecozelinae
Moths of Europe